Bignami is the northern terminus station of Line 5 of the Milan Metro. The station is located at the intersection of Viale Fulvio Testi and Via Emilio Bignami, near the border with Sesto San Giovanni.

Like the adjacent street, it commemorates Emilio Bignami, a 19th-century engineer who pioneered modern water and sewage services for the city of Milan.

References

Line 5 (Milan Metro) stations
Railway stations opened in 2013
2013 establishments in Italy
Railway stations in Italy opened in the 21st century